"The Bitter End" is a song by British alternative rock band Placebo. It was released as the lead single from their fourth studio album, Sleeping with Ghosts (2003), on 10 March 2003. The song is based on the novel Nineteen Eighty-Four by George Orwell. There are several references to it throughout the song, one of the most noticeable being the reference to 2 May - the date on which the two main characters, Winston and Julia, first spend the night together. "The Bitter End" and "Every You Every Me" are the two most often played songs in the Placebo's live shows.

Critical response
Critics generally praised the single upon its release. Reviewing Sleeping with Ghosts, BBC.co.uk's rock/indie reviewer Dan Tallis described "The Bitter End" as "a good pop tune", having "just the right amount of dark, gothic atmosphere to please their fans and enough radio friendly guitars to please the new generation of indie kids." The Times thought the song "ramped up the energy level to devastating effect."

Rock Sound reasoned that the track's "kick ass romp" reinforces "their status as purveyors of pure indie pop in the vein of The Smiths." However, NME saw differing influences woven in the track, reporting that "The Bitter End" "sees Placebo powering along with a relentless U2- chasing-after-The Cure melody that's as infectious as 24."

Summarising Placebo's 2004 singles collection, Once More with Feeling, BBC.co.uk's Nottingham music reviewer Jaime Gill stated that "each song stems from a songwriter so instinctive and precise that when he writes a song called "The Bitter End", that's exactly what it sounds like."

Music video
The music video sees the band playing in the dish of the Lovell Telescope, one of the largest radio telescopes. Halfway through the video, it displays an infrared image of a couple chasing after each other. They eventually catch each other up and kiss against a wall. Near the end of the video, the band is rained upon. It was filmed close to Stockport in Cheshire, England.

Track listings
CD 1

CD 2

7-inch vinyl

Formats
"The Bitter End" was released on 10 March 2003 via Elevator Music/Hut Records, the first single to be culled from Sleeping with Ghosts. Two CD singles offering differing B-sides were issued, as well as a single in 7-inch vinyl format. Later, "The Bitter End" saw inclusion on the November 2004 compilation Once More with Feeling: The Singles.

Key
B - "The Bitter End"
D - "Daddy Cool"
T - "Teenage Angst (piano version)"
BV - "The Bitter End video"
E - "Evalia"
DP - "Drink You Pretty"

Charts

References

Placebo (band) songs
2003 singles
2003 songs
Number-one singles in Portugal
Song recordings produced by Jim Abbiss
Songs written by Brian Molko
Songs written by Stefan Olsdal
Songs written by Steve Hewitt
Virgin Records singles